Alyona Rassohyna (born June 11, 1990) is a formerly Soviet now Ukrainian female mixed martial artist who competes in the Atomweight and Strawweight divisions of the ONE Championship. From October 2020 till December 2020, she was ranked #9 Female Atomweight by Fight Matrix

She is ranked #4 in the ONE Championship Women's Atomweight rankings.

Background
Alyona started MMA at the insistence of her father after she was bullied at school  and dad decided that the girl should learn to defend herself. Alyona is a head coach for Club "Rage" in Dnipro, along with her husband Alexey Fedonov. In 2020, she appeared on "Supermama", a Ukrainian psychological family reality, where parents are rated on how good of parents they are.

Mixed martial arts career

Early career

Starting her career in 2010, Alyona fought most of her early career in the regional Ukrainian scene, most for the promotion Oplot Challenge, compiling a 10–2 record. In 2014, she faced Invicta FC vet Katja Kankaanpää at Lappeenranta Fight Night 10 on May 17, 2014 and UFC and Rizin FF vet Seo Hee Ham in Alyona's atomweight debut at Road FC 018 on August 30, 2014.  She lost her fight against Katja via second round armbar and her fight against Ham via unanimous decision.

After her loss to Seo Hee Ham, Alyona took time off from her fighting career due to the birth of her daughter.

Competing with World Warriors Fighting Championship, Alyona won both her bouts for the promotion, against Samantha Jean-Francois and Elaine Leal, the former being for the WWFC Atomweight Championship.

ONE Championship

In her ONE debut, Alyona faced Stamp Fairtex at ONE Championship: Unbreakable 3 on January 22, 2021. Despite being dominating the majority of the fight, Alyona won via submission in the closing seconds, giving Stamp her first loss in MMA competition.

ONE Championship 2021 Atomweight GP

Alyona faced Stamp Fairtex in a rematch as the quarterfinal bout of ONE Championship 2021 Atomweight GP at ONE Championship: Empower on May 28, 2021. However, the event was postponed due to COVID-19. The event was rescheduled for September 3, 2021. She lost the bout via split decision.

Championships and accomplishments
World Warriors Fighting Championship 
WWFC Atomweight Champion (one time)

Mixed martial arts record

|-
| Loss
| align=center|13–5
| Stamp Fairtex
| Decision (split)
| ONE Championship: Empower
| 
| align=center|3
| align=center|5:00
| Kallang, Singapore
| 
|-
| Win
| align=center|13–4
| Stamp Fairtex
| Submission (guillotine choke)
| ONE Championship: Unbreakable 3
| 
| align=center| 3
| align=center| 4:59
| Kallang, Singapore
| 
|-
| Win
| align=center| 12–4
|Elaine Leal
| Submission (armbar)
| World Warriors Fighting Championship 15
| 
| align=center| 1
| align=center| 1:02
| Kyiv, Ukraine
|
|-
| Win
| align=center| 11–4
|Samantha Jean-Francois
|Submission (armbar)
|World Warriors Fighting Championship 11
|
|align=center|1
|align=center|4:25
|Kyiv, Ukraine
|
|-
| Loss
| align=center|10–4
|Seo Hee Ham
| Decision (unanimous)
| Road FC 018
| 
| align=center| 2
| align=center| 5:00
| Seoul, South Korea
|
|-
| Loss
| align=center|10–3
| Katja Kankaanpää
| Submission (armbar)
|Lappeenranta Fight Night 10
|
|align=center|2
|align=center|0:49
|Lappeenranta, Finland
|
|-
| Win
| align=center| 10–2
|Lyudmyla Pylypchak
| Submission (armbar)
| Oplot Challenge 87
| 
| align=center| 1
| align=center| 2:33
| Kharkov, Ukraine
|
|-
| Win
| align=center|9–2
| Yana Kuzioma
| Submission (armbar)
| ECSF: Battle on the Dnieper 2
| 
| align=center| 1
| align=center| 1:21
| Dniprodzerzhynsk, Ukraine
| 
|-
| Win
| align=center|8–2
| Alisa Alimova
| Submission (armbar)
|Oplot Challenge 69
|
| align=center|1
| align=center|2:20
|Kharkov, Ukraine
|
|-
| Win
| align=center|7–2
| Anastasiya Rybalochko
| Submission (armbar)
|Oplot Challenge 37
|
|align=center|1
|align=center|2:28
|Kharkov, Ukraine
| 
|-
| Win
| align=center|6–2
| Marina Logvina
| Submission (armbar)
| Oplot Challenge 16
| 
| align=center| 1
| align=center| 4:15
| Kharkiv, Ukraine
| 
|-
| Loss
| align=center|5–2
| Anna Bezhenar
|Submission (armbar)
|Oplot Challenge 4
|
|align=center| 1
|align=center| 4:30
|Kharkiv, Ukraine
|
|-
| Win
| align=center| 5–1
|Ekaterina Muhortikova
|Submission (armbar)
|IKF: World MMA Championship
|
|align=center|1
|align=center|3:02
|Tallinn, Estonia
|
|-
| Win
| align=center| 4–1
|Anna Moldavchuk
| Submission (armbar)
| Oplot Challenge 2
| 
| align=center| 1
| align=center| 1:16
| Kharkiv, Ukraine
| 
|-
| Win
| align=center| 3–1
| Risalat Mingbatyrova
|Submission (armbar)
|Oplot Challenge 1
|
|align=center|1
|align=center|3:53
|Kharkiv, Ukraine
|
|-
| Win
| align=center|2–1
| Milena Koleva
| Decision (unanimous)
|FDI Real Kech: Battle of Sofia
|
|align=center|3
|align=center|5:00
|Sofia, Bulgaria
|
|-
| Loss
| align=center| 1–1
| Risalat Mingbatyrova
| Decision (unanimous)
|ProFC 28: Union Nation Cup
|
|align=center|2
|align=center|5:00
|Simferopol, Ukraine
|
|-
| Win
| align=center|1–0
| Olga Denisenko
| Decision (unanimous)
|M-1: Battle Of Champions
|
|align=center|2
|align=center|5:00
|Simferopol, Ukraine
| 
|-

See also 
 List of current ONE fighters
 List of female mixed martial artists

References

External links 
  

1990 births
Living people
Sportspeople from Dnipro
Ukrainian female mixed martial artists
Atomweight mixed martial artists
Strawweight mixed martial artists